is a noted designer of Japanese gardens, active in the United States.

Kurisu studied landscape design and construction under Kenzo Ogata in Tokyo, Japan. He then was Landscape director for the Garden Society of Japan (Nihon Teien Kyokai) (1968–1972), during which time he supervised construction of the Portland Japanese Garden. In 1972 he founded Kurisu International, Inc., which has since designed and built a number of gardens.

He designed the Roji-en Japanese Gardens at the Morikami Museum and Japanese Gardens, a set of six gardens representing 1,000 years of Japanese horticultural tradition from the 9th to the 20th centuries. They were completed in 2001. Kurisu designed gardens at the Samaritan Lebanon Community Hospital, in Lebanon, Oregon, which was the winner of a 2006 "Healthcare Environment Award for Landscape Design".

Selected works 
 Anderson Japanese Gardens - Rockford, Illinois
Asian Rock Garden at the Samuel P. Harn Museum of Art - Gainesville, Florida
 Dubuque Arboretum and Botanical Gardens - Dubuque, Iowa
 Portland Japanese Garden - Portland, Oregon
 Roji-en Japanese Gardens at the Morikami Museum and Japanese Gardens -  Delray Beach, Florida
 The Richard & Helen DeVos Japanese Garden at Frederik Meijer Gardens & Sculpture Park - Grand Rapids, Michigan

References

Japanese landscape architects
Year of birth missing (living people)
Living people